Emil "Miel" Gustav Mundt (30 May 1880 in Soekaboemi, Dutch East Indies – 17 July 1949 in Rotterdam) was a Dutch football player who competed in the 1908 Summer Olympics. In the Netherlands, he played for H.V.V. (Hague Football Club).

Biography
He spent his entire playing career at H.V.V., winning the Dutch championship several times. In 1900, Mundt was a member of the H.V.V. side that participated in the first edition of the Coupe Van der Straeten Ponthoz in 1900, regarded by many as the first-ever European club trophy. In the tournament, he scored one goal in the first round in an 8–1 trashing of hosts Léopold FC.

He was the captain of the Dutch team team at the 1908 Summer Olympics, helping his nation win the bronze medal in the football tournament. He only featured in one match, the 0-4 defeat at the hands of Great Britain. In total, he earned four caps for the Netherlands (two wins and two losses), all of which as captain.

Honours

Club
HVV 
Dutch championship:
Champions (6): 1899–1900, 1900–01, 1901–02, 1902–03, 1904–05 and 1906–07
KNVB Cup:
Champions (1): 1903
Coupe Van der Straeten Ponthoz:
Runner-up (1): 1900

International
Netherlands
'''Olympic Games Bronze medal: 1908

See also
List of Netherlands international footballers born outside the Netherlands

References

External links
Profile

1880 births
1949 deaths
Dutch footballers
Footballers at the 1908 Summer Olympics
Olympic footballers of the Netherlands
Olympic bronze medalists for the Netherlands
Netherlands international footballers
Olympic medalists in football
People from Sukabumi
Medalists at the 1908 Summer Olympics
Association football midfielders
Dutch people of the Dutch East Indies